Johnnie Wade is a retired British film and television actor. His most memorable role was playing put upon handyman 'Roger' in the ITV Yorkshire TV comedy series You're Only Young Twice between 1977 and 1981, he is one of only two members of the main cast still living, the other being Georgina Moon.

Born in Bethnal Green, he was a market trader and became a singer in cabaret and with a band after winning talent contests.
His first television break was in 1960s soap opera Compact as Stan Millet. He then performed in musicals including South Pacific and Guys and Dolls. His other television appearances include The Two Ronnies, Porridge (playing 'Scrounger'), Coronation Street and Z-Cars.

Selected filmography
 The Body Stealers (1969)
 Carry On Again Doctor (1969)
 For the Love of Ada (1972)
 The Stick-Up (1977)
 The Music Machine (1979)
 George and Mildred (1980)
 Funny Money (1983)

Discography
As Johnny Wade:-

A: Funny Thing.
B: Shadow Love.
 His Master's Voice, UK, POP 757, 7", June 1960.

A: Andiamo.
B: You Fool Of A Heart.
 Piccadilly Records, UK, 7N 35076, 7", September 1962.

A: Paradise.
B: Looking For Me.
 Piccadilly, UK, 7N 35115, 7", April 1963.

References

External links
 

Living people
English male film actors
English male television actors
Year of birth missing (living people)
Place of birth missing (living people)